The Ankole mole-rat or Ankole African mole-rat (Tachyoryctes ankoliae) is a species of rodent in the family Spalacidae found in southwestern Uganda and northwestern Tanzania. Its natural habitats are moist savanna and arable land. Some taxonomic authorities consider it to be conspecific with the East African mole-rat.

References

Tachyoryctes
Mammals described in 1909
Taxa named by Oldfield Thomas
Taxonomy articles created by Polbot
Taxobox binomials not recognized by IUCN